Balatonfüred is a district in southern part of Veszprém County. Balatonfüred is also the name of the town where the district seat is found. The district is located in the Central Transdanubia Statistical Region.

Geography 
Balatonfüred District borders with Veszprém District to the north, Balatonalmádi District to the east, Siófok District and Fonyód District (Somogy County) to the south, Tapolca District to the west. The number of the inhabited places in Balatonfüred District is 22.

Municipalities 
The district has 1 town and 21 villages.
(ordered by population, as of 1 January 2013)

The bolded municipality is city.

See also
List of cities and towns in Hungary

References

External links
 Postal codes of the Balatonfüred District

Districts in Veszprém County